gamma-Decalactone is a lactone and aroma compound with the chemical formula C10H18O2. It has an intense-peach flavor. It is present naturally in many fruits and fermented products. It is particularly important in the formulation of peach, apricot, and strawberry flavors. It is used as a flavoring for beverages, personal care, pharmaceutical and household goods, as well as a food additive.

See also
 δ-Decalactone

References 

Gamma-lactones